Neuraeschna is a genus of dragonflies in the family Aeshnidae. Its species are found from Peru and Brazil up through Honduras.

Species

Neuraeschna has fifteen species:

 Neuraeschna calverti 
 Neuraeschna capillata 
 Neuraeschna claviforcipata 
 Neuraeschna clavulata 
 Neuraeschna cornuta 
 Neuraeschna costalis 
 syn. N. ferox 
 Neuraeschna dentigera 
 syn. N. inarmata 
 Neuraeschna harpya 
 Neuraeschna maxima 
 Neuraeschna maya 
 Neuraeschna mayoruna 
 Neuraeschna mina 
 Neuraeschna producta  
 Neuraeschna tapajonica 
 Neuraeschna titania

References

Aeshnidae
Anisoptera genera
Taxa named by Hermann August Hagen